Ingram may refer to:

People 
 Ingram (given name)
 Ingram (surname)
 Ingram baronets, a title in the Baronetage of the United Kingdom,  created 9 August 1893

Places 
 Ingram Park Mall, a mall in Texas, USA
 Ingram, Northumberland, England
 Ingram, California, community in Mendocino County, California, USA
 Ingram, Pennsylvania in  Allegheny County, Pennsylvania, USA
 Ingram, Texas, city in Kerr County, Texas, USA
 Ingram, Wisconsin, village in Rusk County, Wisconsin, USA
 Ingram's Hall, a house at Shrewsbury School

Organizations 
 Ingram Industries, a large US corporation, and its subsidiaries
 Ingram Barge Company, US barge company
 Ingram Micro, a distributor of information technology products
 Ingram Content Group, US book distributor
 Ingram Entertainment Holdings Inc., an American distributor of home entertainment products 
 Ingram Merrill Foundation, a private foundation operated during Ingram Merrill's lifetime and subsidized literature, the arts, and public television

Things 
 Ingram MAC-10, a model of machine pistol
 Ingram MAC-11, a model of machine pistol
 AV-98 Ingram, a fictional type of robot in the Patlabor anime and manga franchise
 6285 Ingram, an asteroid
 Jack Ingram (album), the eponymous debut album by country music artist Jack Ingram  
 USS George W. Ingram (DE-62), a destroyer of the United States Navy  
 Clara Ingram Judson Award (Clara Ingram Judson Memorial Award), given annually to the most creative children's writing

See also 
 Ingham (disambiguation)
 Ingraham (disambiguation)
 Justice Ingram (disambiguation)
 Engram (disambiguation)
Enguerrand